Bibijana Čujec - Dobovišek is a Slovene physicist, (born 25 December 1926, Ljubljana), who obtained her degree in 1950 at the Faculty of Natural Sciences and Mathematics in Ljubljana and in 1959 her PhD in physics at the Faculty of Natural Sciences of University of Ljubljana. From 1954 to 1961 she worked at the Jožef Stefan Institute, specialized later in Pittsburgh, United States, and in 1963 moved to Canada.

Life and scientific career 

Bibijana Čujec, born Dobovišek, was born on 25 December 1926 in Ljubljana to father Mihael Dobovišek, technician, and mother Mary, born Dolinar, office worker. She attended primary school and grammar school in the Ursulines convent in 1. 1933–45. In 1945-50 she studied mathematics and physics at the Faculty of Natural Sciences of the University of Ljubljana (professors Josip Plemelj and Ivan Vidav for mathematics, Anton Peterlin for physics). After graduating, Čujec worked at the Institute of Physics [SAZU] in 1950-4-4, and at the Jožef Stefan Institute in 1955–61. In 1956 she married Anton Čujec. Bibijana Čujec devoted herself to nuclear physics, and on the basis of her dissertation "Photonuclear reaction with special reference to the Wilkinson model" she received her doctorate in 1959 from the University of Ljubljana. In 1961, she went abroad for postdoctoral training. Until 1963, she worked as a researcher at the University of Pittsburgh in the USA on "stripping" reactions. She then went to Canada, where she was followed by her family. She lectured for the first year (1963-4) at the University of Alberta in Edmonton, then transferred to Laval University in Quebec. In 1964 she began as an assistant, in 1966 she became an associate professor and in 1970 a full professor. While serving at Laval, she worked for two years at the Kellogg Radiation Laboratory at California Institute of Technology in Pasadena, USA, and one year at CERN in Geneva. Čujec taught nuclear physics, elementary particles, modern physics, statistical thermodynamics, experimental physics, etc. In addition to undergraduate lectures, she supported students in obtaining master's and doctoral degrees. Through her work at Laval University, she has made a significant contribution to the development of a study and research program in nuclear physics at this institution. Čujec has been - among other institutions - a member of the American Physical Society and the Canadian Association of Physicists.

Research by B. Cujec has covered various fields of experimental nuclear physics. In the beginning (in Ljubljana and 1954 in Lund, Sweden), she studied basic particles in cosmic rays and photo-nuclear reactions in experiments using the betatron accelerator. Later (in the US and Canada) she devoted herself to nuclear spectroscopy and to studies of 3He and 4He scattering. A study of reactions between heavier cores (e.g. 12C +12C) at low energy followed, while also addressing the field of astrophysics, later reactions among heavier nuclei and proton-antiproton collisions at low energies (CERN 1985–6).

The four children of Bibijana Čujec followed their mother in their professional and research fields: Sonja (born 1957) is a civil engineer, Bibijana (1959) is a doctor-cardiologist, Tomaž (1964) is a molecular biologist, and Ana Marija followed her mother (1967) in physics. Their father, Anton Čujec (born 1924), became an ordained priest in the Catholic eastern rite church and died in 2001.

References

Sources 

 Slovene biographic lexicon - Bibijana Čujec 
 Beyond : life of a nuclear physicist, wife and mother : autobiography. Bibiana Čujec. Victoria, B.C. : B. Čujec, c2012.  (ISBN 9780988069107)
 Scientific contributions of B. Cujec

1926 births
Living people
Slovenian women physicists
Slovenian physicists
Scientists from Ljubljana
University of Ljubljana alumni
People associated with CERN
Canadian nuclear physicists